The SamaWorld Theme Park and Destination Resort is an abandoned theme park development in Genting Highlands, Pahang, Malaysia. Planning began in the 1980s and construction started in the 1990s but the project was never completed.

Location 
The abandoned SamaWorld site is located on a mountain slope between the Genting Highlands Resort and the Ion Delemen high-rise complex. It lies beneath the road leading to Amber Court and Ion Delemen, now called Jalan Ion Delemen.

History 
With Asia’s economic boom in the 1980s income levels increased and demand for leisure activity was raising. This led to the construction of many amusement parks in Asia. Two Malaysian entrepreneurs, Lim Tuck Fatt and Lim Tuck Sing proposed the SamaWorld theme park for the Genting Highlands. The second son of the Sultan of Selangor Tengku Sulaiman Shah was chairman of SamaWorld (Malaysia) Sdn Bhd and Lim Tuck Fatt was managing director. SamaWorld (Malaysia) was a subsidiary of SamaWorld Asia Sdn Bhd.  70% of the Sama World Asia consortium was held by the Lim Brothers together with Tengku Sulaiman Shah and the remaining 30% were held by the Malaysian Government (Selangor State Development Corporation). Later Kuala Lumpur International Sdn Bhd, a subsidiary of the Police Cooperative, invested in SamaWorld. The office of SamaWorld (Malaysia) was in the Wisma Sama building in Petaling Jaya.

The Sama Holdings Group with foreign investors, consultants and contractors from the US, Australia, Taiwan, Japan, West Germany, France, and Canada planned to undertake the project. The Sama Group was a conglomerate of diverse companies in trading (Sama Corporation, later renamed SamaWorld Management), manufacturing (Sama Plastic Industries), properties (Sama Land Development), and more. Sama was owned by Sakullah Holdings, a company founded by Lim Tuck Fatt and S. Kulasegaran. 

The SamaWorld project comprised a Disney-like theme park, a hotel, residential and commercial developments, a health spa, a clubhouse, and a special events area with live shows (3,500-seat amphitheater/Entertainment Complex). The estimated cost was around 1 billion Malaysian dollar including land clearing and initial infrastructure development cost around 540 million dollar and the theme park development around 600 million dollar. Financing was 35 % from equity and 65 % from borrowing. Initial assistance was by Shearson Lehman Malaysia and Rakyat Merchant Bankers Bhd. A deal with the Canadian mining company Giant Bay Resources Ltd. was arranged and Giant Bay developed the residential and commercial part around SamaWorld. 

The total area of the SamaWorld project was 140 hectares with 39 hectares occupied by the theme park. Planning and construction was difficult because of the dense jungle terrain on a 5,500-foot-high mountain sloping 20 to 30 degrees. The land was cleared and construction of the park started. The work had heavy civil engineering components with hand-dug caisson piles, slope stabilizations and construction of the highest reinforced earth structures at the time in Malaysia. The construction of a preview center on the site was financed by a fast food chain (believed to be KFC). First, the park was scheduled to open in 1990, then 1993, and later in 1995. The mountainous terrain and heavy monsoons led to a stop of the work. The expected opening was delayed until 1996 whereby the size of the park was scaled down to 12 hectares. Khong Guan (a biscuit manufacturer) bought 69% of SamaWorld and the completion date was set to 1998. With the consequences of the Asian financial crisis 1997 the project was abandoned. In 2003 an official receiver was appointed to take over the management of SamaWorld (Malaysia).

Name and marketing 
According to the magazine Variety, sama means “happy” in Malay. The SamaWorld logo was a squirrel next to a globe with a banner reading “SamaWorld” and the slogan “Fantasy & Fun For Everyone”. The project was announced in the New Straits Times with the phrase “A Small Step Taken By Us, A Giant Stride for Malaysians and the Nation.“

SamaWorld Theme Park 
Planned was a Disneyland-type theme park with the concept “See the World in a Day”. The continents Asia, Europe, Africa, and America should have been represented by attractions and landmark-replicas of different countries and the different areas connected via cable cars. 

1. Plans for the Asian Adventure: Behind the main entrance Malaysia with traditional Malaysian and colonial style facades, with a representation of all 13 federal Malaysian states (for example, Selangor with a craftsman making pewter objects and satay), a full sized 130 m long replicated part of the Great Wall of China built with the assistance of the Chinese Government, the Krakatoa volcano with a working eruption, a Japanese garden, a Japanese tea cup ride, and other activities from India, Singapore and Hong Kong. 

2. Plans for the European Fantasy: King Arthur's castle with Merlin's magic show, a hall with artificial falling snow called the Ice Kingdom, Viking longboat rides, and Venice gondola rides. 

3. Plans for the Americas: For North America a Wild West Town including saloons and cowboys, for South America a jungle terrain with a water log flume canoe ride as an "Indiana Jones" type adventure, and an Inca pyramid. 

4. Sama 5000: Planned was a futuristic World with intergalactic battles. 

In 1986 was announced that Sequoia Creative, a company from Los Angeles founded by the former Walt Disney executives Dave Schweninger, Thomas Reidenbach and Robert Gurr would equip SamaWorld with animated attractions. For example, Capt. Andy´s RiverTowne Revue, which featured a cast of 14 animated characters singing and telling jokes in 15 minute musical revues. Architect of the theme-park was Kumpulan Akitek Sdn Bhd. The design of the park was by the Dallas based company Leisure and Recreation Concepts (LARC) with Michael Jenkins as Concept Designer. The Sidney based Woodhead Firth Lee architects designed residential villas with a European village theme and made the interior design of the Ice Kingdom, the Americas and the entertainment centre. Planned was a total of 42 rides including a Von Roll Skyway over the rainforest, a Vekoma Mine Train, a Mack Log Flume, a Zierer Wave Swinger, a Fionda Boat Swing, a Dragon coaster, and a monorail. SamaWorld purchased nearly all rides. The Park should have started to operate under SamaWorld Theme Park Sdn Bhd, a subsidiary of SamaWorld (Malaysia). A mostly US staffed management team trained 1400 locals to run the hotel, restaurants and underground interactive rides. Construction was by Bovis (Malaysia) Sdn Bhd and later by Actacorp. Entrance fees for adults were set to 30 Ringgit and for Children to 20 Ringgit. The planned opening hours were weekdays 11 am to 7 pm and weekends/holidays 11 am to 10 pm. Expected were three million visitors with 80 % locals in the first year of operation. Taiwans Tung-Hai University planned a permanent management training chapter in the middle of SamaWorld.

SamaWorld Theme Resort (Resort Hotel) 
Construction of the 850-room four-star hotel consisting of a three-level podium, a five-level car park, a 17-storey and eight storey tower had started. Planned were leisure facilities like a tennis court, a games room, and a health spa. The development cost was 300 million Ringgit. Architect was Gerak Reka Akitek Sdn. The construction company was Cygal Bhd, the technical consultant was Hotel Resources International (M) Sdn Bhd and the land was owned by SamaWorld Theme Hotel Sdn Bhd. Construction stopped at 4 storey’s height. Cygal (now Sycal) had a 70 % share of the hotel development and is now constructing the Genting Sky City project on the site.

Residential and commercial development 

At first the development of 324 bungalows by MCB Holdings Bhd was planned. Landowner was Golden Apartments Sdn Bhd. Later MCB Holdings withdraw the deal. In 1990 Giant Bay Resources acquired Techlines Corp Sdn Bhd, a bankrupt company that owned the land surrounding SamaWorld. Techlines was renamed Giant Bay (Malaysia) Sdn Bhd. Giant Bay (M) was responsible for the residential and commercial development around SamaWorld. Planned were apartments, condominiums, and bungalows (Regency Village, Asian Village, International Village) on an 80-hectare site. Financing was partly through a 10 million Dollar loan from Citibank. Giant Bay (M) changed the name to Villa Genting and finished the apartment Amber Court. Construction of the Billion Court Condominiums started but was never finished. The NCT-Group purchased the abandoned Billion Court and developed it with the Ion Delemen high-rise complex.

Long-term plans 
SamaWorld aimed for becoming an international brand. Therefore, SamaWorld was incorporated in different countries with SamaWorld Hong Kong, SamaWorld Japan, SamaWorld Singapore, and SamaWorld Vancouver. Another SamaWorld with the same concept was planned in Beijing and in 1990 preliminary talks with the Chinese authorities were held.

Redevelopment plans 
Redevelopment of the abandoned site is difficult due to a limited infrastructure capacity mainly in water supply. A mixed development with serviced apartments together with a sewage treatment and a water treatment plant was proposed in 2015.

References

Further reading 

 De Lapp, S.E. (1992): The Making of SamaWorld: A Case Study of the Theme Park Development Process

External links 
 SamaWorld Theme Park 
 SamaWorld Logo
 SamaWorld Resort Hotel
 Happy the Violinist  

Genting Highlands
Buildings and structures in Pahang
Defunct amusement parks in Malaysia